Typhoon Herb, known in the Philippines as Typhoon Huaning, was the strongest and the largest storm of 1996. Herb struck the Ryūkyū Islands, Taiwan and the People's Republic of China, causing major damage. The name Herb was used in the Western Pacific name list for the first time after the list had been revised earlier in 1996. Although the name was not retired, the Western Pacific name list was changed from English names to Asian names in 2000, so 1996 was in fact the only occasion when the name was used (it was never used in the Atlantic Ocean or the Eastern Pacific.)

Meteorological history

The active monsoon trough that spawned Typhoons Frankie (08W) and Gloria (09W) consolidated into a third area well east of the other two to develop Tropical Depression 10W near Saipan on July 23. It moved northward at first, then westward in response to the subtropical ridge to its north. Tropical Depression 10W was upgraded to Tropical Storm Herb on July 24. Tropical Storm Herb moved west, growing in size and strengthening to Typhoon Herb on July 25 before 48 hours later reaching Category 4. Herb slightly weakened while it underwent a Fujiwhara interaction with Typhoon Gloria. Shortly afterward Herb began to intensify again, and became a Category 5 super typhoon on July 30. Herb also became a very large typhoon: the largest typhoon in July and one of the largest typhoons since 1977.

Herb struck the Ryūkyū Islands and made landfall in northern Taiwan as a Category 4 super typhoon on July 31. The eye of the storm passed directly over the capital, Taipei. Herb weakened as it crossed Taiwan and then the Taiwan Strait, to make landfall in China as a strong Category 2. Herb rapidly weakened over the country, and dissipated on August 3.

Impact

Ryūkyū Islands
Prior to the typhoon's arrival in the southern Ryūkyū Islands, officials issued storm warnings for most islands and canceled 76 flights. On the island, a barometric pressure of 927.1 mbar (hPa; 27.38 inHg) was measured. Widespread damage took place across the southern Ryūkyū Islands, with losses reaching ¥667 million (US$6.2 million). On Ishigaki Island, one home was destroyed and eighteen others were damaged. Extensive losses to agriculture, fisheries, and forestry took place across the region as well. Losses on Ishigaki alone reached ¥630 million (US$5.9 million). In Okinawa, large swells up to  flooded low-lying areas, leaving minor damage.

Taiwan
In Taiwan, heavy rain from Herb caused flooding and major damage. In Taiwan, at least 51 people were killed and 22 went missing.  Herb is the fourth wettest known tropical cyclone to impact the country.

Mainland China
In China, the code name of the typhoon was "9608", and over 13,000 people were injured or killed, including 779 deaths.  Total damage to agriculture and property totaled US$5 billion (1996 dollars).

Notes

See also

List of tropical cyclones
 List of wettest tropical cyclones
Typhoon Soulik (2013)
Typhoon Haitang (2005)
Typhoon Longwang

References

External links

JMA General Information of Typhoon Herb (9609) from Digital Typhoon
JMA Best Track Data (Graphics) of Typhoon Herb (9609)
JMA Best Track Data (Text)
JTWC Best Track Data of Super Typhoon 10W (Herb)
Taiwan Central Weather Bureau Report of Super Typhoon 10W (Herb)

1996 Pacific typhoon season
Typhoons in Japan
Typhoons in Taiwan
Typhoons in China
Typhoon Herb
Typhoon Herb
Typhoons